Dominique Tonnerre (born 23 May 1974) is a French former basketball player who competed in the 2000 Summer Olympics.

References

1974 births
Living people
French women's basketball players
Olympic basketball players of France
Basketball players at the 2000 Summer Olympics